Jassar is a surname. Notable people with the surname include:

 Salwa al-Jassar, Kuwaiti politician
 Tarsem Jassar (born 1986), Punjabi lyricist, singer, and producer
 Wael Jassar (born 1976), Lebanese singer

Jassaris a jatt surname in Punjab India.

See also
 Jassar
 Nassar